The Amsterdam Tournament  is a pre-season football tournament held for club teams from around the world, hosted at the Amsterdam ArenA. The 2001 tournament was contested by Ajax, Liverpool, Milan and Valencia on 26 July and 28 July 2001. Ajax won the tournament for the first time.

Table

NB: An extra point is awarded for each goal scored.

Matches

Day 1

Day 2

References

2001 
2001–02 in Dutch football
2001–02 in Italian football
2001–02 in Spanish football
2001–02 in English football